Stig Mårtensson (8 April 1913 – 17 November 1995) was a Swedish tennis player.

Tennis career
Mårtensson represented Sweden in one Davis Cup tie, the 1937 Europe Zone quarterfinal tie against Belgium played at the Royal Léopold Club in Brussels. Mårtensson and Kalle Schröder played the singles rubbers, with Mårtensson losing his first match against Charles Naeyaert and thereafter also his second match against André Lacroix.

Mårtensson played at the 1937 Wimbledon Championships, losing in the first round of both the singles and doubles events. In 1943 he won the singles title at the Swedish National Outdoor championships and in 1948 he won the singles title at the tournament in Bude, beating David Warwick, 4–6, 6–2, 6–4 in the final.

See also
List of Sweden Davis Cup team representatives

References

External links 
 
 

1913 births
1995 deaths
Swedish male tennis players
Tennis players from Stockholm